The 1992–93 Scottish Cup was the 108th staging of Scotland's most prestigious football knockout competition. The Cup was won by Rangers who defeated Aberdeen in the final.

First round

Second round

Replays

Third round

Replays

Fourth round

Replays

Quarter-finals

Replay

Semi-finals

Final

See also
1992–93 in Scottish football
1992–93 Scottish League Cup

Scottish Cup seasons
Scottish Cup, 1992-93
Scot